The Research Organization for Archaeology, Language, and Letters (ORARBASTRA) is one of Research Organizations under the umbrella of the National Research and Innovation Agency (BRIN). On 24 January 2022, the formation of the agency is announced and to be formed on 1 February 2022. The agency is resulted from amalgamation of National Archaeology Research Institute, former Agency for Research and Development and Book Affairs of the Ministry of Education and Culture, part of Research, Development, Education, and Training Agency of the Ministry of Religious Affairs, and Bureau for Checking Copies of the Quran of the Ministry of Religious Affairs.

ORARBASTRA was inaugurated on 1 March 2022 thru Chairman of BRIN Decree No. 12/2022, backdated from 25 February 2022.

The agency is currently led by Herry Jogaswara in acting head capacity.

Structure 
The structure of ORARBASTRA is as follows:

 Office of the Head of ORABSTRA
 Research Center for Prehistoric and Historic Archaeology
 Research Center for Environmental Archaeology, Maritime Archaeology, and Cultural Sustainability
 Research Center for Archaeometry
 Research Center for Language and Literatures Preservation
 Research Center for Language, Letters, and Community
 Research Center for Manuscripts, Literature, and Oral Traditions
 Research Center for Treasures of Religion and Civilization
 Research Groups
Aside of these research centers, ORARBASTRA also inherited National Archaeology Research Institute branch offices.

 National Archaeology Center Yogyakarta Branch
 National Archaeology Center Denpasar Branch
 National Archaeology Center Bandung Branch
 National Archaeology Center Palembang Branch
 National Archaeology Center Manado Branch
 National Archaeology Center Medan Branch
 National Archaeology Center Banjarmasin Branch
 National Archaeology Center Makassar Branch
 National Archaeology Center Ambon Branch
 National Archaeology Center Jayapura Branch

References 

Science and technology in Indonesia
Research institutes in Indonesia
2022 establishments in Indonesia
National Research and Innovation Agency